Channichthys is a genus of marine ray-finned fish belonging to the family Channichthyidae, the crocodile icefishes. They are native to the Southern Ocean.

Taxonomy
Channichthys was first formally described as a genus in 1844 by the Scottish naval surgeon, naturalist and Arctic explorer John Richardson when he described the unicorn icefish (Channichthys rhinoceratus) which he placed in a new monotypic genus. Subsequently up to nine species have been classified within Channichthys  which is what FishBase does while Catalog of Fishes recognises 5 species while other authorities are of the view that the genus is monotypic and that C. rhinoceratus is the only species. The genus name is a compound of channos meaning "gape" and ichthys which means "fish", alluding to the wide gape of these fishes.

Species

The species of this genus are quite similar to each other, and reliable ways of distinguishing them include the shape of their dorsal fins, gill raker count and relative eye diameter to snout length. 

 Channichthys aelitae  – Aelita icefish
 Channichthys bospori  – big-eyed icefish
 Channichthys irinae  – pygmy icefish
 Channichthys mithridatis  – green icefish
 Channichthys panticapaei  – charcoal icefish
 Channichthys rhinoceratus  – unicorn icefish
 Channichthys richardsoni  – robust icefish
 Channichthys rugosus  – red icefish
 Channichthys velifer  – sail icefish

Characteristics
Channichthys icefishes may have a backwards pointing spine on the snout and small tubercles on the upper surface of the head. The operculum has 5-7 robust spines with blunt spines on the other opercular bones. They have 2 lateral lines which have bony plates, although they may have other plates on their flanks. In the pelvic fin the third ray is longer than the others, The first dorsal fin is tall and in large specimens the fin rays have small tubercles on them. The first and second dorsal fins are clearly separated. They have a rounded caudal fin.

Distribution, habitat and biology
Channichthys icefishes are restricted to the Kerguelen-Heard region of the Indian sector of the Southern Ocean. They are demersal fishes. They are mainly piscivorous but will also eat algae. They spawn in the summer and migrate into shallow water to do so.

Fisheries
Channichthys icefishes, particularly C. rhinoceratus, are caught as bycatch in botton trawls for the mackerel icefish (Champsocephalus gunnari).

References

Channichthyidae
 
Fish of the Southern Ocean